James Patten (born 1977) is an American interaction designer, inventor, and visual artist. Patten is a TED fellow and speaker whose studio-initiated research has led to the creation of new technology platforms, like Thumbles, tiny-computer controlled robots; interactive, kinetic lighting features; and immersive environments that engage the body.

Education 
Patten earned his doctorate at the MIT Media Lab where he studied in the Tangible Media Group under Hiroshi Ishii. He received his PhD in Media Art and Sciences for his thesis, "Mechanical Constraints as Common Ground between People and Computers" and his MS in the same subject for his thesis, "Sensetable: A Wireless Object Tracking Platform for Tangible User Interfaces." Prior to the Media Lab, Patten studied virtual environments with Randy Pausch at the University of Virginia, and developed new interfaces for visualizing time-varying volumetric data at NASA Langley Research Center.

Work 
Patten's work has been exhibited or performed in various venues including the Cooper Hewitt, Smithsonian Design Museum, the Museum of Modern Art, the Transmediale Festival in Berlin, the Museo Guggenheim Bilbao and the Ars Electronica Center in Linz, Austria and recognized in several international design competitions.

James Patten is Director and Principal of Patten Studio, a decade old practice operating at the confluence of design, technology, and physical space to create interactive experiences. Projects and clients vary in scale and across industries, from brand activations, like Intel's SenseScape at CES 2016, to installations for public institutions, like the Museum of Science and Industry (Chicago) to monolithic rotating projectors for Rag & Bone's Spring/Summer Fashion Show 2017. His body of work however remains consistent, conceptually, in its merging of both digital and physical spaces for "richer, real-world" tangibility. Patten's article, "Architecting Experiences" introduces a new set of design principles towards creating constructive "physical resonance." Particularly, poignant are his ideas on improvisation and empowering people to be the authors of their own experiences, a view all the more relevant, with increasing filtration of online algorithms.

Awards
 2014 - TED Senior Fellow
 2010 - Winner, American Association of Museums Muse Gold, Best Interactive Kiosk for “Create a Chemical Reaction”
 2011 - TED Fellow
 2005 - Honorable Mention - Transmediale Media Arts Festival for “Corporate Fallout Detector”
 2005 - Director’s grant - Council for the Arts at MIT for “Corporate Fallout Detector”
 2004 - Best in Show, Best Interactivity, Best in Academic Category - Designing Interactive Systems competition for “Audiopad”
 2004 - Honorable Mention - International Design Magazine Annual Design Review for “Audiopad”
 2004 - Bronze Award - Industrial Design Society of America - International Design Excellence Awards for “Audiopad" 
 2004-2006 - MIT Arts Scholar
 2003-2005 - Mastercard Fellow, MIT Media Lab
 2002-2003 - Intel Fellow, MIT Media Lab
 2000-2001 - Mitsubishi Electric Research Lab Fellow, MIT Media Lab
 1999 - Honorable Mention, Computing Research Association Outstanding Undergraduate Award
 1998 - Louis T. Rader Research Award, Department of Computer Science, University of Virginia
 1996-1999 - Echols Scholar - University of Virginia
 1995 - Rodman Scholar - University of Virginia

References

External links
Patten Studio

1977 births
Living people
American designers
21st-century American inventors